Nkechinyelu Peter Ezugwu    is an English business person and former professional basketball player.

Playing career 
In 2000, he played in the Italian squad of Aurora Jesi of the Serie A2 where he came off the bench. After two years in Spain where he played for Melilla,  Joventut Badalona and Breogán, in 2002 he returned to the Seria A2 where he joined Robur Osimo, but ended the season with Scafati. Then again he went to Spain where he played for Inca in the LEB.

In the 2004–05 Lega Basket Serie A season, Ezugwu made his debut in Italy's top division when he was a permanent member of Air Avellino's starting lineup. From here, after a brief interlude at Zaragoza, he played another three seasons in Italy's Serie A2, two with Pavia and one with Andrea Costa Imola. In April 2008 he has a brief stunt with experience with Široki of Bosnia and Herzegovina, then he returned to the Serie A2 at Dinamo Sassari, with which he reaches the final of the play-offs with a personal contribution of 9.9 points and 6.9 rebounds. The following year he returned to Andrea Costa Imola, playing again in the Serie A2.

In January 2011, after a brief engagement in the 2009–10 Liga Nacional season with 9 de Julio de Río Tercero and Boca Juniors, he returned once again to the Serie A2 where he played for Unione Cestistica Casalpusterlengo. In the summer of 2012 he played with La Banda Olympic Cyclist.

External links
Profile at Eurobasket.com
Profile at Proballers.com
Profile at basketball-reference.com

1976 births
Living people
9 de Julio de Río Tercero players
A.S. Junior Pallacanestro Casale players
Andrea Costa Imola players
Aurora Basket Jesi players
Boca Juniors basketball players
CB Breogán players
CB Inca players
CB Zaragoza players
Ciclista Olímpico players
Eastern Michigan Eagles men's basketball players
Joventut Badalona players
Melilla Baloncesto players
Pallacanestro Pavia players
Scafati Basket players
S.S. Felice Scandone players
English expatriate sportspeople in Argentina
English expatriate sportspeople in Italy
English expatriate sportspeople in Spain
English expatriate sportspeople in the United States
English expatriates in Bosnia and Herzegovina
English men's basketball players
Sportspeople from Shrewsbury
English people of Igbo descent